Antonis Ikonomopoulos (born 9 May 1998) is a Greek professional footballer who plays as a right-back for Super League club Volos.

Honours
PAS Giannina
 Super League Greece 2: 2019–20

References

1998 births
Living people
Greece youth international footballers
Super League Greece players
Football League (Greece) players
Super League Greece 2 players
Panathinaikos F.C. players
A.E. Sparta P.A.E. players
Apollon Smyrnis F.C. players
PAS Giannina F.C. players
Volos N.F.C. players
Association football defenders
Footballers from Athens
Greek footballers